The Southern Africa Litigation Centre or SALC is a non-profit organization based in Johannesburg, South Africa which supports human rights lawyers in Southern Africa countries with expert legal advice, technical support and funding. SALC was founded by Nicole Fritz and she served as director for ten years. Kaajal Ramjathan-Keogh was thereafter appointed director and was later replaced by Anneke Meerkotter.

The SALC is a joint project of the International Bar Association's Human Rights Institute (IBAHRI) and the Open Society Initiative for Southern Africa (OSISA), and focuses on three principal areas: support for human rights cases, advice on constitutional advocacy in the Southern African region, and training in human rights and rule of law issues. It is based in Johannesburg, and operates in Angola, Botswana, the Democratic Republic of Congo, Lesotho, Malawi, Mozambique, Namibia, Swaziland, Zambia and Zimbabwe.

Important cases in which the centre has acted include Southern Africa Litigation Centre v National Director of Public Prosecutions, National Commissioner of the SAPS v Southern Africa Litigation Centre, and Mmusi and Others v Ramantele and Another. The Centre supported The Lesbians, Gays & Bisexuals of Botswana also known by the acronym LeGaBiBo or LEGABIBO in a successful challenge to a refusal to register the LEGABIBO. The Centre incubated AfricanLII from October 2010 to March 2013.

References

External links
 Official site

Law in Africa
Legal organisations based in South Africa